Nott Corona is a corona, a geological formation in the shape of a crown, located on the planet Venus at -32.3° N and 202° E. It is located in the Isabella quadrangle. It is named after Nótt, the Scandinavian goddess of the Earth.

Geography and geology 
Nott Corona covers a circular area about 150 km in diameter.

See also
List of coronae on Venus

References

External links 
 USGS Planetary Names – Helen Planitia
 NASA site devoted to the exploration of Venus

Surface features of Venus